Bill McCoy (13 January 1906 – 1 January 1980) was a New Zealand cricketer. He played ten first-class matches for Auckland between 1929 and 1937.

See also
 List of Auckland representative cricketers

References

External links
 

1906 births
1980 deaths
New Zealand cricketers
Auckland cricketers
People from Geraldine, New Zealand
Cricketers from Canterbury, New Zealand